is a Japanese politician serving in the House of Representatives in the Diet (national legislature) as a member of the Liberal Democratic Party. A native of Edogawa, Tokyo and graduate of Waseda University he was elected for the first time in the 2005 general election.

References

External links 
 Official website in Japanese.

Members of the House of Representatives from Tokyo
Koizumi Children
Waseda University alumni
People from Edogawa, Tokyo
1967 births
Living people
Liberal Democratic Party (Japan) politicians